Twin Lakes Senior High School is a public high school located in Monticello, Indiana.

Athletics
Twin Lakes Senior High School's athletic teams are the Indians and they compete in the Hoosier Athletic Conference. The school offers a wide range of athletics including:

Baseball
Basketball (Men's and Women's)
Cheerleading
Cross Country
Football
Golf (Men's and Women's)
Soccer (Men's and Women's) 
Softball
Swimming (Men's and Women's)
Tennis (Men's and Women's)
Track and Field (Men's and Women's)
Volleyball
Wrestling

See also
 List of high schools in Indiana

References

External links
 Official website

Schools in White County, Indiana
Public high schools in Indiana